Maria Kirilenko and Nadia Petrova were the defending champions, but only Kirilenko tried to defend her title.
She partnered with Victoria Azarenka but they lost in semifinals against Gisela Dulko and Flavia Pennetta. 
Dulko and Pennetta eventually won in the final against Sara Errani and María José Martínez Sánchez, 6–3, 2–6, [10–6].

Seeds

Draw

Draw

References
 Doubles Draw

Kremlin Cup - Women's Doubles
Kremlin Cup